Czech Republic women's national floorball team is the national team of Czech Republic.

Its biggest success is bronze medal from the 8th World Championships in 2011, which took place in Switzerland. Czech Republic has appeared in every World and European women's championships tournament organised by the IFF.

World Championships

Source:

References 

Women's national floorball teams
Floorball
Floorball in the Czech Republic